Roy Lee Wilkins (December 26, 1933October 4, 2002) was an American football linebacker in the National Football League (NFL) for the Los Angeles Rams and  the Washington Redskins.

He played college football at the University of Georgia and was drafted in the sixth round of the 1957 NFL Draft.

References

1933 births
2002 deaths
People from Murray County, Georgia
American football linebackers
Georgia Bulldogs football players
Los Angeles Rams players
Washington Redskins players